P-Model (also typeset as P-MODEL and P. Model) was a Japanese electronic rock band started in 1979 by members of the defunct progressive rock band Mandrake. The band has experienced many lineup revisions over the years but frontman Susumu Hirasawa was always at the helm of operations. P-Model officially disbanded in 2000, although many of its members continue to release solo albums and collaborate with each other on different projects.

Hirasawa has since released work under the name , effectively a solo revival of the band.

Members
 – guitar, vocals, synthesizer, Miburi, Heavenizer, Graviton, Amiga, programming (1 January 1979 – 20 December 2000; 2004–2005, 2013–2014, 2018 )

Former members

 – bass, combo organ, synthesizer, keyboard (1 January 1979 – 20 March 1983; 2013 )
 – drums, cymbals, percussion, electronic drums, drum machine (1 January 1979 – 22 December 1984; 14 March 1987 – 28 December 1988 )
 – bass, vocals, keyboard, synthesizer, Tubular Hertz (1 January 1979 – 3 November 1980; 23 September 1991 – 11 October 1993)
 – bass, synthesizer (21 November 1980 – 5 August 1984)
 – keyboard, guitar, vocals (27 March 1983 – 27 December 1985)
 – bass, electric violin, double bass, ocarinas (bass, tenor and soprano), synthesizer, MSX, vocals (28 August 1984 – 27 December 1985)
 – drums, cymbals, percussion, electronic drums (22 December 1984 – 14 March 1987)

 – bass (fretted and fretless), keyboard, vocals (23 January 1986 – 28 December 1988)
 – Systems (23 January 1986 – 27 September 1987)
 – keyboard, synthesizer, vocals, Compact Macintosh, programming (1 November 1987 – 28 December 1988; 23 September 1991 – 11 October 1993)
 – electronic drums, cymbals (23 September 1991 – 11 October 1993)
 – System-1 (1 December 1994 – 20 December 2000; 11 – 14 January 2014 )
 – System-2, bass (1 December 1994 – 20 December 2000)
 – AlgoRhythm (1 December 1994 – 15 May 1997)
Tainaco – Virtual Drums (21 October 1997 – 20 December 2000)
Amiga program operated through MIDI signals; three types, 1, 2 and E (enhanced) were created. CG model based on drummer Sadatoshi Tainaka, later replaced with photos of Tainaka. Never reappeared after 2000.

Timeline

Discography

Studio albums

Live and Remix-Remake albums

Compilations
P-Plant CD Vol. 1, 2000
, 2002
Golden☆Best, 2004
P-Model Warner Years Singles Box, 2012

Singles
Art Mania, 1979
Kameari Pop, 1979
Missile, 1980
junglebed II, 1981
Index P-0, 1983
Soldi Air Dance Version, 1983
Ikari, 1984
Re;, 1985
P-Model Another Act 6, 1985
Another Day, 1986
Opening SE 1992, 1992
demo, 1994
SAKSIT North Passage MIX, 1996>>>Unfix One>>> *Rocket Shoot*, 1996>>>Unfix Eight>>> *Ashura Clock*, 1997>>>Unfix Nine>>> *Layer-Green*, 1997

Other releasesModel House Works, 1985Leak/Birds, 1986Pre Drums, 1986, 1986Christmas Songs, 1986SSS-Star Eyes, 1987entro Pack, 1987Legend of Sadatoshi Tainaka, 1987Cassette' Bravo !, 1988Shtu Up'N'Hit Your Stage', 1988Music Industrial Wastes〜P-Model or Die Samples, 1999Virtual Live Samples, 1999Dekikake, 1999Moon Plant-I (full), 1999Astro-Ho (narration Version), 1999
Falling Rain (P-Model version), 1999
, 1999
Global Tribute Battle, 2000
Phase-7, 2000

Videography
Moire Vision, 1988
, 1988
Bitmap 1979–1992, 1992
Ending Error, 1996
, 1997
Live Video "Music Industrial Wastes〜P-Model or Die", 2000

Music Videos
All videos from the Great Brain to Harm Harmonizer were directed by Yuichi "You1" Hirasawa (Susumu's brother). "Fu-Ru-He-He-He", "2D or Not 2D" and "Grid" were included in "Bitmap 1979–1992"; "Monotone Grid" was included in "Phton-3"; "http" was included in "Rocket Shoot"; "Logic Airforce" was included in "Live Video Music Industrial Wastes〜P-Model or Die".

The Great Brain, 1979
I am Your Only Model, 1980
different≠another, 1981
potpourri, 1981
natural, 1981
disgusting telephone, 1981
Heaven, 1982
Perspective, 1982
Be in a Fix, 1982
Hoka No Keikaku, 1983
Echoes, 1983
Fu-Ru-He-He-He, 1983
Atom-Siberia, 1984
Harm Harmonizer, 1984
Karkador, 1986
Another Day, 1986
2D or Not 2D, 1992
Grid, 1992
Monotone Grid, 1994
Power to Dream, 1995
http, 1996
Ashura Clock (Discommunicator), 1997
Logic Airforce, 1999

Legacy
P-Model, as well Susumu Hirasawa through his solo career, have been influential both on musicians, as well as on artists that work on other mediums, with a reputation for having many fans in the manga and anime industries. Their creative collaborators (and even 6 of the band's members) often started out as big fans of and directly influenced by their work: Berserk mangaka Kentaro Miura has found that listening to Hirasawa's songs has helped him regain focus on the themes of his writing multiple times, mangaka/anime director Satoshi Kon wrote that Hirasawa's work was "a source of imagination and creativity for me" over the last 20 years of his life, film director Daihachi Yoshida considers Hirasawa as the creator of "about half of my way of thinking".

Other artists that have expressed adoration for their work include Klaha of Malice Mizer, Shiroi Heya no Futari mangaka Ryoko Yamagishi, Arika Takarano of Ali Project, Roujin Z/JoJo's Bizarre Adventure director Hiroyuki Kitakubo, voice actress/singer Sumire Uesaka, musician/actor Gen Hoshino, Hellsing mangaka Kouta Hirano, Demon Slayer: Kimetsu no Yaiba mangaka Koyoharu Gotouge, Fullmetal Alchemist/Concrete Revolutio director Seiji Mizushima, Fate/stay night [Réalta Nua]/Taiko no Tatsujin composer Satoshi "hil" Ishikawa and actress/singer Ko Shibasaki.

The five main characters of the K-On! franchise (Yui Hirasawa, Mio Akiyama, Ritsu Tainaka, Tsumugi Kotobuki and Azusa Nakano) are in a band, share the surnames of late '80s P-Model members and play their respective primary instrument (save for Nakano). All referenced members who are still active have acknowledged the connection. Besides that, P-Model references can also be found on the manga The Sorrow of a Perfectly Healthy Girl and Opus; as well the anime Sailor Moon, Perfect Blue, BECK: Mongolian Chop Squad and Space Dandy. In the world of theatre, musician/playwright  named 2 of his stage plays ( and Blue Cross) after P-Model songs and 1 (Haldyn Hotel) after a Hirasawa solo song.

References
Citations

External links
P-MODEL's Site (English and Japanese)
P-MODEL Fansite

Musical groups established in 1979
Musical groups disestablished in 2000
Japanese new wave musical groups
Japanese rock music groups
Tokuma Japan Communications artists
Japanese techno music groups